The Jammu and Kashmir Police or JKP is the law enforcement agency of Jammu and Kashmir (union territory). JKP was established in 1873 and has primary responsibilities in law enforcement and investigation within Jammu and Kashmir in India.

History

The first specific Jammu & Kashmir police force came into existence in the year 1873 with one police officer known as Kotwal and 14 Thanedars for Srinagar City. This police force would control crime and take care of law and order situations with help of Chowkidars and Harkars, who were paid mandatorily by the residents of Imperial Kashmir Union.

It was in 1913 that the state requisitioned the service of an Imperial Police (IP) officer on deputation and appointed Mr Broadway as the first Inspector General of Police in June, 1913. He continued to be Police chief up to 1917 and was followed by other IP officers.

Since then the Police in J&K has undergone several re-organizations, The employee strength of Police in J&K in the year 1889-90 was 1040, which further rose to 1570 in the year 1903 and forty years later, in 1943–44, the strength of J&K Police was 3179 and at present it has exceeded 83000 mark.

Organizational structure
Jammu and Kashmir Police comes under direct control of Ministry of Home Affairs, Government of India.
The Jammu and Kashmir Police is headed by Director General of Police (DGP) who is always a senior IPS officer.

Special agencies
 Intelligence Unit (Crime Branch)
 Commando Force      
 Security Battalion
Special Operations Group

Hierarchy
Officers
Director General of Police (DGP)
Additional Director General of Police (ADGP)
Inspector General of Police (IGP)
Deputy Inspector General of Police (DIG) 
Senior Superintendent of Police (SSP)
Superintendent of Police (SP)
Deputy Superintendent of Police (DySP)

Sub-ordinates
Inspector 
Sub-Inspector (SI)
Assistant Sub-Inspector (ASI)
Head Constable (HC) 
Selection Grade Constable 
Constable
Follower
Special Police Official (SPO)

Gallantry Awards
In the wake of insurgency the jammu kashmir police participate many operations against terrorists jointly with armed forces. In those operations many policemen laid down their lives. Some of them got Peace time gallantry awards.
Assistant Sub Inspector Babu Ram, Constable Altaf Hussain Bhat and Special Police Officer Shahbaz Ahmad have been posthumously awarded Ashok Chakra, Kirti Chakra and Shaurya Chakra, respectively. These are the three highest peacetime gallantry awards, given for showing exemplary courage in service of the nation

Notable achievements 
Jammu Kashmir Police has consistently shown highest performance among all Indian states in law enforcement. On the occasion of 75 years of India's independence, Jammu Kashmir Police received 108 gallantry medals, which was highest among all Indian states. J&K Police cornered 62% of awards for   In 2021 Jammu Kashmir Police became the first to win all three highest gallantry awards in India, viz Ashok Chakra, Kirti Chakra and Shaurya Chakra.

Controversies 
Jammu Kashmir Police has been accused of wrongly discharging criminals and failure to track its own police personnel. Indian poet Dr Tapan Kumar Pradhan in his books and social media posts has exposed serious loopholes in criminal investigation by Jammu and Kashmir police, especially with regard to Hemangi Sharma Fraud Case.

Gallery

See also
 Law enforcement in India
 Ladakh Police

References

State law enforcement agencies of India
State agencies of Jammu and Kashmir
Government agencies established in 1873
1873 establishments in India